Samuel Lowry Porter, Baron Porter,  (7 February 1877 – 13 February 1956) was a British judge.

Early life and career
Born in Leeds, Porter was educated at the Perse School and Emmanuel College, Cambridge, where he took a Third in Classics and a Second in Law. He was called to the bar by the Inner Temple in 1905. His legal career was interrupted by World War I. Commissioned into the British Army, he ended the war as a captain on the general list. He was appointed MBE for his war service.

He was appointed King's Counsel in 1925. He was Recorder of Newcastle under Lyme from 1928 to 1932 and Recorder of Walsall from 1932 to 1934.

Judicial career
On 7 November 1934, he was appointed to the High Court, assigned to the King's Bench Division, and received the customary knighthood on 24 November.

On 28 March 1938, he was appointed Lord of Appeal in Ordinary (without having previously served as a Lord Justice of Appeal) and created a life peer with the title Baron Porter, of Longfield in County Tyrone. On 1 April, he was sworn of the Privy Council. In 1939, he was appointed to chair the Lord Chancellor's committee on defamation law. The committee's work was delayed as a result of World War II, not producing its report until 1948. The report's conclusions were implemented by the Defamation Act 1952.

Porter sat on the appeal of William Joyce, commonly known as "Lord Haw-Haw", who had been convicted of treason for his war-time propaganda broadcasts from Nazi Germany, and dissented from the majority. He also dissented in National Anti-Vivisection Society v Inland Revenue Commissioners (1948), a leading case concerning charitable trusts.

Porter resigned as Lord of Appeal in 1954, having been appointed to the Order of the British Empire as a Knight Grand Cross (GBE) in the 1951 New Year Honours.

In his last years, Lord Porter took up rooms at Emmanuel College, of which he was an honorary fellow from 1937. He died at the London Clinic on 13 November 1956, having been due to serve as Treasurer of the Inner Temple in 1957. He was unmarried.

References

1877 births
1956 deaths
Law lords 
Members of the Privy Council of the United Kingdom
Members of the Judicial Committee of the Privy Council
Knights Grand Cross of the Order of the British Empire
Place of birth missing
Place of death missing
Knights Bachelor
Queen's Bench Division judges
Alumni of Emmanuel College, Cambridge
Members of the Inner Temple
English King's Counsel
20th-century King's Counsel
British Army General List officers
Life peers created by George VI